Dylan Moore (born 4 August 1999) is a professional Australian rules footballer playing for the Hawthorn Football Club in the Australian Football League (AFL).

Early career

Moore mixed his football with athletics during his junior career. Moore stated in an interview with the Herald Sun that he participated in athletics in the summer "just to get myself fit for footy in the winter." He took out a state steeplechase title in 2014 and a 1600m event at the Stawell Gift in 2016.

He attended Caulfield Grammar School and won the best and fairest award for the schools First XVIII football side during his draft year.

Ranked by Champion Data as the 12th best player in the 2017 AFL draft, Moore was selected by the Hawthorn Hawks at selection No.67.

AFL career

He injured his shoulder playing for Box Hill after two VFL games and missed eight weeks of footy. Once fit he returned to the team and progressively got better and better. He played a superb finals series for Box Hill, with four goals in the preliminary final and three goals in the victorious Grand Final.

He made his debut against  after a late withdrawal of Jarryd Roughead with injury. Moore managed to play seven games in his debut season.

Dealing with a Covid season, with all Victorian teams in travelling hubs Moore was given three games at the end of the season. In just his tenth game and the last for the 2020 season Moore was awarded a Brownlow vote with 25 disposals and a goal. Following the 2020 season, there was speculation that Moore could be delisted, but the Hawks retained him on the rookie list. He played in 20 games in 2021 and all senior games in 2022. He started rotating through the midfield as the season progressed. The small crumbing forward has developed into a breakaway midfielder.

Statistics
Updated to the end of the 2022 season.

|-
| 2018 ||  || 36
| 0 || — || — || — || — || — || — || — || — || — || — || — || — || — || — || 0
|-
| 2019 ||  || 36
| 7 || 2 || 2 || 36 || 47 || 83 || 31 || 20 || 0.3 || 0.3 || 5.1 || 6.7 || 11.9 || 4.4 || 2.9 || 0
|-
| 2020 ||  || 36
| 3 || 2 || 1 || 18 || 22 || 40 || 14 || 5 || 0.7 || 0.3 || 6.0 || 7.3 || 13.3 || 4.7 || 1.7 || 1
|-
| 2021 ||  || 36
| 20 || 27 || 11 || 160 || 147 || 307 || 76 || 58 || 1.4 || 0.6 || 8.0 || 7.4 || 15.4 || 3.8 || 2.9 || 0
|-
| 2022 ||  || 13
| 22 || 26 || 14 || 243 || 201 || 444 || 124 || 92 || 1.2 || 0.6 || 11.0 || 9.1 || 20.2 || 5.6 || 4.2 || 1
|- class="sortbottom"
! colspan=3| Career
! 52 !! 57 !! 28 !! 457 !! 417 !! 874 !! 245 !! 175 !! 1.1 !! 0.5 !! 8.8 !! 8.0 !! 16.8 !! 4.7 !! 3.4 !! 2
|}

Notes

Honours and achievements
Team
 VFL premiership player: 2018

Individual
  vice–captain: 2023–
  best clubman: 2022
  mark of the year: 2022

References

External links

Living people
1999 births
Australian rules footballers from Victoria (Australia)
Eastern Ranges players
Box Hill Football Club players
Hawthorn Football Club players
People educated at Caulfield Grammar School